The 1963 Chicago White Sox season was the team's 63rd season in the major leagues, and its 64th season overall. They finished with a record of 94–68, good enough for second place in the American League, 10½ games behind the first-place New York Yankees.

Offseason 
 January 14, 1963: Luis Aparicio and Al Smith were traded by the White Sox to the Baltimore Orioles for Hoyt Wilhelm, Ron Hansen, Dave Nicholson, and Pete Ward.

Regular season

Season standings

Record vs. opponents

Opening Day lineup 
 Jim Landis, CF
 Nellie Fox, 2B
 Joe Cunningham, 1B
 Floyd Robinson, RF
 Pete Ward, 3B
 Dave Nicholson, LF
 Ron Hansen, SS
 J. C. Martin, C
 Ray Herbert, P

Notable transactions 
 May 5, 1963: Dom Zanni was traded by the White Sox to the Cincinnati Reds for Jim Brosnan.
 May 9, 1963: Sammy Esposito was released by the White Sox.

Roster

Player stats

Batting 
Note: G = Games played; AB = At bats; R = Runs scored; H = Hits; 2B = Doubles; 3B = Triples; HR = Home runs; RBI = Runs batted in; BB = Base on balls; SO = Strikeouts; AVG = Batting average; SB = Stolen bases

Pitching 
Note: W = Wins; L = Losses; ERA = Earned run average; G = Games pitched; GS = Games started; SV = Saves; IP = Innings pitched; H = Hits allowed; R = Runs allowed; ER = Earned runs allowed; HR = Home runs allowed; BB = Walks allowed; K = Strikeouts

Awards and honors 
All-Star Game
 Nellie Fox, reserve
 Juan Pizarro, reserve

Farm system 

LEAGUE CHAMPIONS: Indianapolis, Sarasota, Clinton

Middlesboro affiliation shared with Chicago Cubs

Notes

References 
 1963 Chicago White Sox at Baseball Reference

Chicago White Sox seasons
Chicago White Sox season
Chicago